Panchchuli Glacier is a Himalayan glacier, situated in the Pithoragarh district of Uttarakhand, India.

Geography 
It is located in the easternmost part of Kumaun. It is in the west and east of five peaks of Panchchuli on the Johar Valley and Darma valley. Uttari Balati glacier is situated north to it.
Panchachuli group of glaciers includes:
 Meola
 Sona
 Uttari Balati
 Dakshini Balati

The popular trek is through the Darma Valley to East Facing glacier. Pithoragarh-Dharchula-Tawaghat-Sobla-Dar-Sela-Bailing-Son-Duktu. The glacier is the source of the Yuli River.

See also
 List of glaciers

References 

Glaciers of Uttarakhand
Geography of Pithoragarh district